David Warren may refer to:

 David Warren (American football) (born 1978), former collegiate American football player
 David Warren (diplomat) (born 1952), British diplomat
 David Warren (director), American theatre and television director
 David Warren (inventor) (1925–2010), inventor of the flight data recorder
 David Warren (Medal of Honor) (1836–?), American Civil War sailor and Medal of Honor recipient
 David Warren (professor), former president of Ohio Wesleyan University, 1984–1993
 David Warren (runner) (born 1956), British distance runner
 David H. Warren, academic administrator and educator
 David H. D. Warren, computer scientist
 Dave Warren (footballer) (born 1981), striker who played for League of Ireland side Cork City
 Dave Warren, Academy Award nominated art director, see 82nd Academy Awards